Choe Ju-song (born 27 January 1996) is a North Korean footballer who currently plays as a forward for Amrokkang Sports Club.

Career statistics

International

References

External links
 

1996 births
Living people
North Korean footballers
North Korea international footballers
North Korea youth international footballers
Association football forwards
Amnokgang Sports Club players
North Korea under-20 international footballers